BBC Radio 3 New Generation Artists scheme (also known as the NGA scheme) was launched in 1999 by Adam Gatehouse as part of the BBC's commitment to young musical talent.

Each autumn six or seven young artists at the beginning of careers on the national and international music scenes join the scheme for a two-year period. Since 2006 a jazz artist has also been invited every other year. The artists are given performance opportunities, including Radio 3 studio recordings, appearances and recordings with the BBC Orchestras and appearances at several music festivals, including the Cheltenham International Festival and the BBC Proms. They also regularly appear at the Edinburgh Festival, Aldeburgh Festival, East Neuk Festival, Gregynog Festival, Lufthansa Festival of Baroque Music and the York Early Music Festival. Artists also appear at London's Wigmore Hall in the Radio 3 Lunchtime Concert series, as well as at The Sage Gateshead and other UK concert venues.

As part of the scheme Radio 3 has also collaborated with record companies, including nine co-production CDs with EMI Debut series, three of which (Belcea Quartet, Simon Trpceski and Jonathan Lemalu) have won Gramophone Awards for the best Debut CD of the year. There have also been co-productions with Harmonia Mundi, Decca, BIS, Sony Classical, Onyx, Signum and Basho Music, while a number of New Generation Artists have also featured on BBC Music Magazine cover CDs.

2022–2024

 Fergus McCreadie jazz piano (UK)
 Geneva Lewis violin (New Zealand)
 Hugh Cutting countertenor (UK)
 Leonkoro Quartet (Germany)
 Masabane Cecilia Rangwanasha soprano (South Africa)
 Ryan Corbett accordion (UK)
 Santiago Cañón-Valencia cello (Colombia)

2021–2023

 Helen Charlston mezzo-soprano (UK)
 Konstantin Krimmel baritone (Germany)
 Kunal Lahiry collaborative piano (Indian-American)
 María Dueñas violin (Spain)
 Mithras Trio piano trio (UK)
 Tom Borrow piano (British-Israeli)
 William Thomas bass (UK)

2019–2022

 Eric Lu piano (United States)
 Alexander Gadjiev piano (Slovenia/Italy) 
 Timothy Ridout viola (UK) 
 Consone Quartet (UK)
 Johan Dalene violin (Sweden) 
 Rob Luft jazz guitar (UK) 
 Ema Nikoslovska mezzo-soprano (Macedonia/Canada)

2018–2020

 Alessandro Fisher tenor (UK)
 Anastasia Kobekina cello (Russia)
 Aris Quartet (Germany)
 Elisabeth Brauss piano (Germany)
 James Newby baritone (UK) 
 Katharina Konradi soprano (Kyrgyzstan)

2017–2019

 Quatuor Arod (France)
 Aleksey Semenenko violin (Ukraine)
 Mariam Batsashvili piano (Georgia)
 Simon Höfele trumpet (Germany)
 Catriona Morison mezzo-soprano (Scotland)
 Thibaut Garcia guitar (France)
 Misha Mullov-Abbado jazz bass (UK)

2016–2018

 Amatis Piano Trio (Netherlands)
 Andrei Ioniţă (cello - Romania)
 Ashley Riches (bass-baritone - UK) 
 Calidore Quartet (United States)
 Eivind Holtsmark Ringstad (viola - Norway)
 Fatma Said (soprano - Egypt)

2015–2017

 Annelien Van Wauwe (clarinet – Belgium)
 Beatrice Rana (piano – Italy)
 Ilker Arcayürek (tenor – Turkey) 
 Kathryn Rudge (mezzo-soprano – UK)
 Laura Jurd (jazz trumpet – UK)
 Peter Moore (trombone – UK)
 Van Kuijk Quartet (France)

2014–2016

 Alec Frank-Gemmill (French horn - UK)
 Armida Quartet (Germany)
 Benjamin Appl (baritone - Germany)
 Esther Yoo (violin - US/Korea/Belgium)
 Narek Hakhnazaryan (cello - Armenia)
 Pavel Kolesnikov (piano - Russia)

2013–2015

 Kitty Whately (mezzo-soprano - UK)
 Olena Tokar (soprano - Ukraine)
 Lise Berthaud (viola - France)
 Louis Schwizgebel (piano - Switzerland)
 Zhang Zuo (piano - China)
 Danish String Quartet (Denmark)

2012–2014

 Mark Simpson (clarinet - UK)
 Robin Tritschler (tenor - Ireland)
 Elena Urioste (violin - United States)
 Leonard Elschenbroich (cello - Germany)
 Sean Shibe (guitar - UK)
 Apollon Musagete (string quartet - Poland)
 Trish Clowes (jazz saxophone - UK)

2011–2013

  Christian Ihle Hadland (piano - Norway)
 Clara Mouriz (mezzo-soprano - Spain)
 Signum Quartet (string quartet - Germany)
 Ruby Hughes (soprano - UK)
 Jennifer Johnston (mezzo-soprano - UK)
 Igor Levit (piano - Germany)
 Veronika Eberle (violin - Germany)

2010–2012

 Benjamin Grosvenor (piano - UK)
 Ben Johnson (tenor - UK)
 Veronika Eberle (violin - Germany)
 Alexandra Soumm (violin - France)
 Nicolas Altstaedt (cellist - Germany)
 Shabaka Hutchings (jazz reeds - UK)
 Escher String Quartet (string quartet - United States)

2009–2011

 Atos Piano Trio (piano trio - Germany)
 Khatia Buniatishvili (piano - Georgia)
 Malin Christensson (soprano - Sweden)
 Elias Quartet (string quartet - UK)
 Henk Neven (baritone - Netherlands)
 Francesco Piemontesi (piano - Switzerland)

2008–2010

 Meta4 Quartet (Finland)
 Jennifer Pike (violin - UK)
 Tai Murray (violin - United States)
 Daniela Lehner (mezzo-soprano - Austria)
 Giuliano Sommerhalder (trumpet - Italy)
 Andreas Brantelid (cello)
 Mahan Esfahani (harpsichord - United States)
 Tom Arthurs (jazz trumpet)

2007–2009

 Allan Clayton (tenor - UK)
 Ingrid Fliter (piano - Argentina)
 Pavel Haas Quartet (Czech)
 Maxim Rysanov (viola - Ukraine)
 Elizabeth Watts (soprano - UK)
 Shai Wosner (piano - Israel)

2006–2008

 Aronowitz Ensemble (UK)
 Sharon Bezaly (flute - Israel)
 Ronan Collett (baritone - UK)
 Ebène Quartet (string quartet - UK)
 Danjulo Ishizaka (cello - Germany)
 Eduard Kunz (piano - Russia)
 Gwilym Simcock (jazz piano - UK)

2005–2007

 Christianne Stotijn (mezzo soprano - Netherlands)
 Cédric Tiberghien (piano - France)
 Martin Helmchen (piano - Germany)
 Alina Ibragimova (violin - Russia)
 Andrew Kennedy (tenor - UK)
 Alexei Ogrintchouk (oboe - Russia)
 Psophos Quartet (France)

2004–2006

 Christian Poltera (cello - Switzerland)
 Christine Rice (mezzo-soprano - UK)
 Trio Ondine (Piano Trio - Denmark)
 Alison Balsom (trumpet - UK)
 Antoine Tamestit (viola - France)
 Royal String Quartet (Poland)
 Andrew Kennedy (tenor - UK)

2003–2005

 Llyr Williams (piano - UK)
 Artemis Quartet (Germany)
 Ailish Tynan (soprano - Ireland)
 Martin Fröst (clarinet - Sweden)
 Colin Currie (percussion - UK)

2002–2004

 Jonathan Lemalu (bass-baritone - New Zealand)
 Jonathan Biss (piano - United States)
 Claudio Bohorquez (cello)
 Janine Jansen (violin - Netherlands)
 The Galliard Ensemble (UK)
 Sally Matthews (soprano - UK)

2001–2003

 Simon Trpceski (piano - Macedonia)
 Alice Coote (mezzo-soprano - UK)
 Ilya Gringolts (violin)
 Li-Wei (cello - China)
 Karol Szymanowski Quartet (Germany)
 Lawrence Power (viola - UK)

2000–2002

 Alexander Melnikov (piano - Russia)
 Ashley Wass (piano - UK)
 Kungsbacka Piano Trio
 Ronald Van Spaendonck (clarinet - Belgium)
 Emma Bell (soprano - UK)
 James Rutherford (bass-baritone)

1999–2001

 Lisa Batiashvili (violin - Georgia)
 Alban Gerhardt (cello - Germany)
 Steven Osborne (piano - UK)
 Paul Lewis (piano - UK)
 Belcea Quartet (UK)
 Jerusalem Quartet (Israel)
 François-Frédéric Guy (piano - France)
 Natalie Clein (cello - UK)
 Lisa Milne (soprano - UK)
 Christopher Maltman (baritone - UK)
 Emily Beynon (flute - UK)
 Leopold String Trio (UK)

Specialist artists 
In 2006 Welsh pianist Gwilym Simcock was invited as the first jazz artist to join the New Generation Artists scheme. This continues every other year with jazz trumpeter Tom Arthurs joining in 2008 and jazz reeds player Shabaka Hutchings in 2010.

In 2008 Iranian harpsichordist Mahan Esfahani joined as the scheme's first artist playing an early instrument, though he has also made a serious mark as an interpreter of 20th-century music and newly commissioned compositions.

On 26 September 2012 seven new artists were announced which included the scheme's first guitarist Sean Shibe.

Young Musician of the Year relationship 
Several New Generation Artists are also former participants in the BBC Young Musician of the Year competition.

Winners
 Natalie Clein (cello) – 1994
 Guy Johnston (cello) – 2000 (joined NGA scheme as part of Aronowitz Ensemble)
 Jennifer Pike (violin) – 2002
 Mark Simpson (clarinet) – 2006
 Peter Moore (trombone) – 2008

Finalists
 Colin Currie (percussion) – 1994
 Alison Balsom (trumpet) – 1998
 Magnus Johnston (violin) – 1998 (joined NGA scheme as part of Aronowitz Ensemble)
 Tom Poster (piano) – 2000 (joined NGA scheme as part of Aronowitz Ensemble)
 Benjamin Grosvenor (piano) – 2004

10th Anniversary weekend 
To celebrate the tenth anniversary of the New Generation Artists scheme, over fifty New Generation Artists past and present performed 12 concerts during the bank holiday weekend Saturday 29th - Monday 31 August at the Cadogan Hall in London, as part of the 2009 BBC Proms.

References

External links 
Official BBC website
Youtube playlist of performances and interviews

BBC Radio 3
1999 establishments in the United Kingdom